The Greater Accra Regional Hospital (formally the Ridge Hospital) is a major regional hospital located in Accra, Ghana.

History & Background

It is Located in the heart of Accra city, the GARH started as a Hospital for the European expatriates around 1928. It became a District Hospital after Ghana’s independence in 1957 and was later designated as Ridge Regional Hospital in 1997 and now redeveloped and transformed into an ultra-modern 420 bed capacity hospital with the full complement of specialist services that reflects the current social aspirations of the rapidly growing capital city of Ghana.

Medical Directors 

 2016 to 2017

Dr Thomas Anaba served for one year as the MD and was later transferred to the University for Development Studies were he had served as a permanent lecturer before assuming his new role at Greater Accra Regional Hospital. Dr. Thomas Anaba was alleged to have campaigned for the National Democratic Congress in the Garu Tempane constituency in the Upper East Region during the 2016 general elections. However, he denied ever engaging in such act.

 2017 till present
Dr. Emmanuel Kwabla Srofenyoh resumed operation and by Monday, 22 May 2017 he started to deploy his staff into the facility then begin receiving new patients into the facility.

Development 
 The Greater Accra Regional Hospital underwent a 250 million-dollar rehabilitation and development, amid controversies from the then opposition New Patriotic Party who claim the cost of the project is inflated.

References

Hospitals in Ghana